Ionel Daniel Stana (born 2 December 1982) is a Romanian professional footballer who plays as a left midfielder.

External links

1982 births
Living people
People from Balș
Romanian footballers
Association football midfielders
FC Internațional Curtea de Argeș players
AFC Rocar București players
CS Minerul Motru players
FC Petrolul Ploiești players
CS Otopeni players
CSM Ceahlăul Piatra Neamț players
CFR Cluj players
SCM Râmnicu Vâlcea players
CS Pandurii Târgu Jiu players
Liga I players
Liga II players